These are the Canadian number-one country albums of 1989, per the RPM Country Albums chart.

1989
1989 record charts
1989 in Canadian music